The 2003 Edmonton Eskimos finished 1st in the West Division with a 13–5 record and won the Grey Cup in a rematch of the previous year's championship game.

Offseason

CFL Draft

Preseason

Schedule

Regular season

Season standings

Season schedule

Total attendance: 371,054 
Average attendance: 41,228 (68.6%)

Playoffs

West Final

Grey Cup

Awards and records

All-Star selections

References

Edmonton Eskimos
Edmonton Elks seasons
Grey Cup championship seasons
N. J. Taylor Trophy championship seasons
Edmonton Eskimos